Eisa or EISA may refer to:

Computing
 Extended Industry Standard Architecture, a bus standard for computer add-on cards
 EISA partition, an OEM disk partition type
 Enterprise information security architecture

Organisations
 Electoral Institute of Southern Africa, former name of the Electoral Institute for Sustainable Democracy in Africa
 Expert Imaging and Sound Association (EISA Awards)
 European Initiative for Sustainable Development in Agriculture, an association of national and European agricultural associations and organisations

Other uses
 Eisa, a daughter of the jötunn Logi in Norse mythology
 Hossam Eisa, Egyptian politician and academic
 Eisa (dance), a form of folk dance in Japan
 Energy Independence and Security Act of 2007 (EISA 2007)